The Federal Government of Belgium exercises executive power in the Kingdom of Belgium. It consists of ministers and secretary of state ("junior", or deputy-ministers who do not sit in the Council of Ministers) drawn from the political parties which form the governing coalition. The federal government is led by the Prime Minister of Belgium, and ministers lead ministries of the government. Ministers together form the Council of Ministers, which is the supreme executive organ of the government (equivalent to a cabinet).

Formally, executive power is vested in the king, who formally appoints the ministers. However, under the Constitution of Belgium, the king is not politically responsible for exercising his powers, but must exercise it through the ministers. The king's acts are not valid unless countersigned by a minister, and the countersigning minister assumes political responsibility for the act. Thus, in practice, the ministers do the actual day-to-day work of governing.

Function and composition
At the federal level, executive power is wielded by the federal government, whilst the prime minister is the head of the government. Each minister heads a ministry, and secretaries of state, who are deputy to a minister, help run these ministries. The government reflects the weight of political parties that constitute the current governing coalition for the Chamber. No single party or party family across linguistic lines holds an absolute majority of seats in Parliament. Under current practice, no party family can win enough seats to govern alone, let alone win a majority.

The number of ministers is limited to 15, equally divided between French-speaking and Dutch-speaking ministers, according to Article 99 of the Constitution. Although the prime minister is officially exempt from this quota, no francophones held the post from 1979 to 2011. Some of the ministers are also deputy prime ministers; but in addition to taking the position of acting prime minister, they are also the link between the government and their political parties. A deputy prime minister is the voice of their political party within the federal government, and is also the voice of the federal government within their political party. Government meetings are conducted through simultaneous interpreters.

The prime minister and his ministers administer the government and the various Federal Public Services (roughly equivalent to ministries in other countries' administrative organization). As in the United Kingdom, ministers must defend their policies and performance in person before the Chamber.

An important de facto body is the "inner cabinet" (kernkabinet; conseil des ministres restreint or kern), consisting of the Prime Minister and the deputy prime ministers. They meet to make the most important political decisions.

Formation
After the elections, the Prime Minister of the former government offers his resignation to the king, and the formation process for a new government starts. The incumbent government remains in office in a caretaker role until the new government is sworn in. This process is based largely on constitutional convention rather than written law. The king is first consulted by the President of the Chamber of Representatives and the President of the Senate. The King also meets a number of prominent politicians in order to discuss the election results. Following these meetings, an Informateur is appointed.

The Informateur has the task of exploring the various possibilities for the new Federal Government and assessing which parties can form a majority in the Federal Parliament. He also meets with prominent people in the socio-economic field to learn their views on the policy that the new Federal Government should conduct. The Informateur then reports to the King and advises him about the appointment of the Formateur. However the King can also appoint a second Informateur or appoint a royal mediator. The task of a royal mediator is to reach an agreement on contentious issues, resolve remaining obstacles to the formation of a Federal Government and prepare the ground for a Formateur. On 5 July 2007 King Albert II appointed Jean-Luc Dehaene as royal mediator to reach an agreement on a new State Reform.

The Formateur is appointed by the king on the basis of the informateur's report. The task of the Formateur is to form a new government coalition and lead the negotiations about the government agreement and the composition of the government. If these negotiations succeed, the Formateur presents a new Federal Government to the king. Usually, the Formateur also becomes the Prime Minister.

In accordance with article 96 of the Belgian Constitution, the King appoints and dismisses his ministers. However, since all royal acts require the countersignature of a minister, the outgoing Prime Minister countersigns the Royal Order appointing the new Prime Minister, who then countersigns the Royal Order accepting the resignation of his predecessor. The Prime Minister then countersigns the royal orders appointing the other members of the new Federal Government.

The appointed ministers take the oath of office before the king. After they have taken the oath, the new Council of Ministers meets to draw up the declaration of government, in which the Federal Government sets out the main lines of the government agreement and outlines the government agenda. The Prime Minister reads the declaration of government to the Chamber of Representatives, which then holds a debate on the declaration of government. Following this debate, a vote of Confidence takes place. If the Prime Minister obtains the confidence of the majority, he can begin implementing the government agreement.

Recent political developments
Catholics and later Christian Democrats have led most of the governments in Belgian history. However, from 1999 until 2007, liberal Guy Verhofstadt led two "purple" governments of liberals and socialists, the first of which also included greens. Afterwards, after difficult negotiations and an interim third Verhofstadt government, a government was eventually formed in 2008 led by Christian democrat Yves Leterme. New elections were called in 2010 after liberal Open Vld quit the government. After a record-breaking government formation, the Di Rupo Government was formed; Elio Di Rupo was the first francophone to hold the post of Prime Minister since Paul Vanden Boeynants left office in 1979. The formation of the Di Rupo Government ended the period of political instability between 2007 and 2011. During the 2014 elections, there was political consensus to not repeat this, and the Michel Government was relatively quickly formed, notably excluding socialists and including the Flemish nationalist N-VA.

In May 2019 federal elections in the Flemish-speaking northern region of Flanders far-right Vlaams Belang party made major gains. In the French-speaking southern area of Wallonia the Socialists were strong. The moderate Flemish nationalist party the N-VA remained the largest party in parliament. Belgium’s first female prime minister Sophie Wilmes led the caretaker government since October 2019. The parties finally agreed on federal government 16 months after the elections and The Flemish Liberal party politician Alexander De Croo became new prime minister in October 2020.

Incumbent government
The current De Croo Government, a seven-party cabinet since October 2020, consists of 14 Ministers in a coalition of the Flemish Open Vld, sp.a, CD&V and Groen, and the Walloon Mouvement Réformateur, Parti Socialiste and Ecolo.

See also
 Belgian federal parliament
 Belgian order of precedence
 List of governments in Belgium

References

Further reading

External links 
 

 

1831 establishments in Belgium
European governments
Chancellery